The McDonnell F2H Banshee (company designation McDonnell Model 24) is an American single-seat carrier-based jet fighter aircraft deployed by the United States Navy and United States Marine Corps from 1948 to 1961. A development of the FH Phantom, it was one of the primary American fighters used during the Korean War, and was the only jet-powered fighter deployed by the Royal Canadian Navy. The aircraft's name is derived from the banshee of Irish mythology.

Design and development

The Banshee was a development of the FH Phantom, and planning started before the Phantom entered production. McDonnell engineers intended the aircraft to be a modified Phantom that shared many parts with the earlier aircraft, but it soon became clear that the need for heavier armament, greater internal fuel capacity, and other improvements would make the idea infeasible.

The new aircraft would use much larger and more powerful engines, a pair of newly developed Westinghouse J34 turbojets, nearly doubling the total thrust from  compared to the Phantom but since the larger engines still had to fit within the wing roots, this required a larger and thicker wing. The more powerful engines used more fuel, so the fuselage had to be enlarged and strengthened to increase the fuel capacity. The Navy was replacing the obsolete World War II  machine guns with  cannon, four of which were mounted under the nose where pilots would not be blinded by muzzle flash when firing at night, a problem with the Phantom. The Banshee incorporated an ejection seat, which the Phantom lacked, and a large number of improvements to other aircraft systems. The cockpit was pressurized and air-conditioned, and the flaps, landing gear, folding wings, canopy, and air brakes were electrically rather than pneumatically operated. The front of the windscreen was bulletproof glass that was electrically heated to prevent frost.

The Banshee had a "kneeling" nose landing gear with a pair of small wheels forward of the regular nosewheel. The regular nosewheel would be retracted so the aircraft rested on the smaller wheels. It could taxi with its nose down, redirecting the hot jet blast up to enhance safety, and to allow parked aircraft to be tucked under each other to save space. This was usually removed from later variants as it was found to be of little use and caused deck handling problems.

A mockup was completed in April 1945, designated XF2D-1. The project survived the end of war cancellations, but development slowed down and the first of three prototypes was not completed until late 1946. Its first flight was on 11 January 1947, from Lambert Field, St. Louis, Missouri. It was redesignated XF2H-1 in 1947, after the Navy ordered an unrelated jet fighter from Douglas, which had previously been assigned the manufacturer's letter D. Fifty-six were ordered in May 1947.

Similarities to the FH-1 meant that McDonnell was able to complete the first F2H-1 in August 1948, a mere three months after the last FH-1 was built. The empennage was new, the dorsal fin was reduced and dihedral was eliminated from the horizontal stabilizers. The wing and tail were reduced in thickness to increase the critical Mach number and different airfoil sections were used. The F2H-1 was retrofitted with  engines as they became available.

Although the Navy was satisfied with the F2H-1, it was the more capable F2H-2 that was most widely used. With Westinghouse J34-WE-34  thrust engines, it had significantly improved performance. The wings were strengthened to add provision for  wingtip fuel tanks but unlike those of the contemporary Grumman F9F Panther, the Banshee's wingtip tanks were detachable. 
Two armament pylons were added under each inboard and outboard wing, for a total of eight, allowing the aircraft to carry  of stores, consisting of up to four  bombs and four  unguided rockets. The "kneeling" nose gear was omitted from the F2H-2 and most subsequent Banshee variants.

The F2H-2 was the basis for three sub-variants.
The F2H-2B had strengthened wings and an additional pylon adjacent to the intake on the port side to allow it to carry a  Mark 7 nuclear bomb or a  Mark 8 nuclear bomb. To compensate for the increased load, the F2H-2B was fitted with stiffer landing gear struts and a pilot-switchable aileron power boost.
The latter was necessary to control the roll to the left when a heavy nuclear bomb was carried. One cannon was removed to provide room for the electronics needed to arm the weapon. 25 F2H-2Bs were built.

The F2H-2N was the US Navy's first carrier-based jet night fighter, making its first flight on February 3, 1950, although only 14 would be built. It had a  longer nose that housed a Sperry Corporation AN/APS-19 radar which required that the cannons be moved back to make room. An F2H-2N was returned to McDonnell to serve as the prototype for the enlarged F2H-3. Some F2H-2Ns retained the "kneeling" nose feature of the earlier F2H-1.

The F2H-2P photo-reconnaissance version had six cameras in a  longer nose and was the US Navy's first jet-powered carrier-based reconnaissance aircraft. First flight was on 12 October 1950, and 90 were built. The pilot could rotate the cameras in both vertical and horizontal planes, and the aircraft could carry a pair of underwing pods that each contained 20 flash cartridges for night photography. The camera bay was electrically heated. As a result, the F2H-2P was responsible for supplying roughly 40% of the United States Air Force (USAF) Fifth Air Force's daytime reconnaissance needs.

This allowed the detachable wingtip fuel tanks to be reduced to  each, and due to the increased internal capacity, these were now seldom needed. The cannons were moved back, away from the nose to accommodate the larger diameter radar while allowing for an increased ammunition capacity. The horizontal stabilizers were lowered from the fin to the fuselage and were given dihedral, and on all but the first aircraft, large triangular fillets were added to the leading edges. The F2H-3 also added provisions for aerial refueling consisting of as-needed bolt-on, in-flight refueling probe that replaced the upper port cannon. 250 were built, with the first flight being made on March 29 1952. 

An F2H-3P reconnaissance variant was proposed to replace the F2H-2P but was not built.

The final variant to be produced was the F2H-4. The F2H-4 was externally indistinguishable from the F2H-3.

McDonnell also created at least 48 proposals, including a long range escort fighter (Model 24H), a two-seat night fighter (Model 24N), a two-seat trainer (Model 24P), a two seat interceptor (Model 24Q), several single seat interceptors (models 24R & 24S), multiple variants with lengthened fuselages, alternate wings and tails, swept wings (model 24J, and others) and afterburners (model 24K, 24L and others), and various engine (model 24W, and others) and radar installations (model 24Y, and others), few of which were built. Plans for adding afterburners were canceled after a test aircraft suffered extensive damage to the wing and tail after the afterburners were lit.

Production ended on 24 September 1953 after 895 aircraft had been delivered. Under the 1962 unified designation system surviving F2H-3 and F2H-4 were redesignated F-2C and F-2D respectively while F2H-1 and F2H-2 (F-2A and F-2B) had already been retired. No Banshee flew under the new designations as the last examples were already in storage when the new designations came into effect.

Operational history

US Navy and Marine Corps

US Navy and Marine pilots often referred to the F2H as the "Banjo". The F2H-2 served during the Korean War with the US Navy's Task Force 77 and the Marine Corps.

Due to its good performance at high altitude, the F2H-2 initially proved its worth as an escort fighter for the USAF bombers supporting United Nations Command (UNC) ground forces.

From mid-1950, the F2H-2 had negligible exposure to hostile aircraft over Korea, due to several factors. During the opening weeks of the war, the North Korean air force had been almost completely annihilated by UNC fighter units. Later, North Korea and its allies were unable to operate from airfields near combat zones in South Korea, forcing them to operate out of air bases in China. As a result of their air superiority throughout most of 1950, UNC squadrons were able to carry out ground attack missions instead, especially close air support and interdiction of North Korean army supply lines.

The Banshee, like most naval jets of its generation, had a serious handicap. Naval air services, including the USN, had resisted faster, swept wing designs from fears that poor low speed flight characteristics made them unsafe to operate from aircraft carriers. Consequently, the Banshee was almost  slower than the latest land-based fighters. Their obsolescence was reinforced by the introduction  of the Mikoyan-Gurevich MiG-15 in November 1950. Most UNC air combat missions, such as patrols over "MiG Alley", were undertaken by North American F-86 Sabres of the USAF Far East Air Forces. Consequently, F2H fighters operated most of the war beyond the range of enemy fighters. Banshee pilots scored no victories, while three F2H-2s were lost to anti-aircraft gunfire.

The F2H-2P flew reconnaissance missions during the Korean War, primarily with the USMC. At that time of the war, surface-to-air missiles had not yet been deployed and few enemy aircraft had radar, while AA guns were ineffective against fast, high-altitude targets. Air defense was still largely visual, and so a lone high-flying F2H-2P was almost impossible for ground forces to shoot down. The aircraft was in demand for its invaluable battlefield photography. F2H-2Ps had USAF fighter escorts when in areas frequented by enemy fighters. Despite being deployed constantly throughout the war, only two F2H-2Ps were lost to radar-directed AA gunfire, and suffered no air-to-air losses.

The USN deployed the radar-equipped F2H-3 and F2H-4 for all-weather fleet defense after the Korean War as a stopgap measure until the swept wing Grumman F-9 Cougar and McDonnell F3H Demon, and delta wing Douglas F4D Skyray could be deployed. Later Banshee variants were only briefly on the front lines and saw no action. Similarly, the F2H-2P was superseded by the F9F-8P (later RF-9J) variant of the F9F Cougar and the F8U-1P (later RF-8A) variant of the Vought F8U Crusader as these aircraft became available.

During the Korean War, the US was concerned about the lack of intelligence available should there be a war in Europe involving the Soviet Union, in particular on the location of airfields. The US Navy's "Operation Steve Brody", with four F2H-2P photo reconnaissance Banshees were to fly from a carrier on routine maneuvers off Greece and fly north, photographing Russian territory bordering the Black Sea. In May 1952, this was presented to Secretary of Defense Robert A. Lovett, but Lovett canceled it.

Later, in 1955, fears of a possible Chinese invasion of Taiwan resulted in Marine F2H-2Ps making 27 overflights of possible Chinese staging areas without incident, escorted by Marine fighter Banshees based in South Korea.

Royal Canadian Navy

In 1951, the Royal Canadian Navy (RCN) drafted a $40 million deal for 60 new Banshees to replace obsolete Hawker Sea Furies. However, the purchase was not approved by the Parliament of Canada until after Banshee production had ended (1953). The RCN acquired 39 second-hand US Navy F2H-3s for $25 million which were delivered from 1955 to 1958.

In order to improve the Banshee as an interceptor, the RCN equipped their aircraft with AIM-9 Sidewinder missiles. The RCN conducted sea trials of the Sidewinder in November 1959, during which several remotely piloted drones were downed.

Although initially well-liked by its Canadian pilots for its flying qualities, the Banshee began to suffer from problems. The RCN would eventually lose 12 of its original 39 Banshees to accidents, a loss rate of 30.8%. One Banshee and its pilot were lost after an inflight failure of the folding wing mechanism, and another Banshee suffered a brake failure and rolled off the carrier's deck into the ocean, drowning its pilot. 

Banshee utilization fell as the RCN shifted to anti-submarine warfare (ASW), which didn't anticipate aerial attacks, and so there was little need for the Banshee. Also, due to the carrier's small size, no room was left for Banshees when Bonaventure was carrying enough Grumman CS2F Trackers for around-the-clock ASW patrols, so it regularly operated without them. The Canadian military was also under pressure to reduce its budget, and the obsolescent Banshees were expensive to maintain as their age and punishing carrier service, and the harsh North Atlantic were taking their toll. Having been the only jet-powered carrier-based fighters deployed by the RCN, the last examples were retired without replacement in September 1962.

Banshees were the primary aircraft of the short-lived RCN Grey Ghosts aerobatic team. The team's name was a play on the Banshee name and the RCN color scheme. The RCN was too small to dedicate aircraft for airshows, so the team flew available operational Banshees for each show.

Aside from the three former RCN Banshees that survive, RCN Banshees were cut up for scrap or burned in firefighting exercises upon their retirement.

Variants

XF2H-1 (XF2D-1) Prototype aircraft (originally designated XF2D-1), three built.
F2H-1 (F-2A) Single-seat fighter version, two 3,000 lbf (1,400 kgf) Westinghouse J34-WE-22 turbojet engines. Initial production version, 56 built.
F2H-2 (F-2B) Improved version with detachable wingtip fuel tanks, eight underwing weapons pylons for 1,580 lb (454 kg) stores capability, 3,250 lbf (1,475 kgf) Westinghouse J34-WE-34 turbojet engines. Second production version, 308 built.
F2H-2B Single-seat fighter-bomber version, strengthened portside weapons pylon for 3,230 lb (1,465 kg) Mark 8 nuclear bomb, 25 built.
F2H-2N Single-seat night fighter version with APS-19 radar housed in lengthened nose, 14 built.
F2H-2P Single-seat photo-reconnaissance version with lengthened nose housing six cameras, 89 built.
F2H-3 (F-2C) Single-seat all-weather fighter version, lengthened fuselage, redesigned tail, increased fuel capacity, eight underwing weapons pylons for 3,000 lb (1,361 kg) bomb load, APQ-41 radar in enlarged nose. 250 built. Redesignated as F-2C in 1962.
F2H-3P Proposed photo-reconnaissance version of the F2H-3; not built.
F2H-4 (F-2D) Improved all-weather fighter version,  thrust Westinghouse J34-WE-38 turbojet engines, APG-37 radar, otherwise similar to F2H-3. Final production version, 150 built. Redesignated as F-2D in 1962.
F2H-5 Unofficial designation for unbuilt proposed swept-wing version with wings, tail and afterburners similar to those of the XF-88 Voodoo.

Operators

 Royal Canadian Navy (F2H-3)
 870 Naval Air Squadron
 871 Naval Air Squadron
 VX-10 (Test Squadron)

 United States Navy
 VX-3 (Evaluation) (F2H-1, F2H-4)
 VF-11 (F2H-2, F2H-4)
 VF-12 (F2H-2)
 VF-22 (F2H-2, F2H-4)
 VF-23 (F2H-3)
 VF-31 (F2H-3)
 VF-41 (F2H-3)
 VF-52 (F2H-3)
 VF-62 (F2H-2, F2H-2P)
 VF-92 (F2H-3, F2H-4)
 VF-101 (F2H-1, F2H-2B)
 VF-114 (F2H-3)
 VF-141 (F2H-3)
 VF-152 (F2H-3)
 VF-171 (F2H-1, F2H-2)
 VF-172 (F2H-1, F2H-2, F2H-2B, F2H-4)
 VF-213 (F2H-3)
 VC-3 (F2H-3)
 VC-4 (F2H-2B, F2H-2N, F2H-3, F2H-4)
 VC-61 (F2H-2P)
 VC-62 (F2H-2P)

 United States Marine Corps Aviation
 VMF-114
 VMF-122 (F2H-2)
 VMF-214 (F2H-4)
 VMF-224 (F2H-2)
 VMF(N)-533 (F2H-4)
 VMJ-1 (F2H-2P)
 VMJ-2  (F2H-2P)

Aircraft on display
Surviving examples are on display in private collections and at several naval air stations and marine corps air stations in the United States as well as in Canada.

Canada
F2H-3
BuNo 126334 – The Military Museums, in Calgary, Alberta.
BuNo 126402 – Shearwater Aviation Museum in Shearwater, Nova Scotia.
BuNo 126464 – Canada Aviation Museum in Ottawa, Ontario.

United States

F2H-2
BuNo 124988 – Flying Leatherneck Aviation Museum, MCAS Miramar, California.
BuNo 125052 – USS Lexington Museum, Corpus Christi, Texas.
BuNo 127693 – NAS Oceana Air Park at NAS Oceana, Virginia.

F2H-2P
BuNo 125690 – Pima Air & Space Museum, adjacent to Davis-Monthan AFB in Tucson, Arizona.
BuNo 126673 – National Naval Aviation Museum at Naval Air Station Pensacola, Florida.
BuNo 128885 – Howell Park in Baton Rouge, Louisiana.

F2H-4
BuNo 127663 – National Naval Aviation Museum at Naval Air Station Pensacola, Florida. Painted as F2H-3 126419.

Specifications (F2H-3)

Popular culture
The aircraft played a central role in the 1953 James A. Michener novel The Bridges at Toko-ri although the 1955 movie adaptation used F9F Panthers for flight scenes.

See also

References

Notes

Bibliography
 Andrade, John. U.S.Military Aircraft Designations and Serials since 1909. Midland Counties Publications, 1979, 

 Baugher, Joe. "McDonnell F2D-1/F2H-1 Banshee." Joe Baugher's Encyclopedia of American Military Aircraft, 3 September 2003. Retrieved: 23 January 2011.
 Francillon, René J. McDonnell Douglas Aircraft since 1920. London: Putnam, 1979. .

 "McDonnell Banshee." Shearwater Aviation Museum Aircraft History, 2009. Retrieved: 1 March 2009.
 "McDonnell Banshee Serial Number 1263334." Naval Museum of Alberta, 2009.  Retrieved: 1 March 2009.
 Mesko, Jim. FH Phantom/F2H Banshee in action. Carrollton, Texas, USA: Squadron/Signal Publications, Inc, 2002. .
 Mills, Carl. Banshees in the Royal Canadian Navy. Willowdale, Ontario: Banshee Publication, 1991. .
 Polmar, Norman. "Historical Aircraft – The Flying Banshee". USNI Naval History, January 2010.
 Standard Aircraft Characteristics: F2H-3,-4 Banshee. Washington, D.C.: United States Navy, 01 May 1951.
 
 Thomason, Tommy H. U.S. Naval Air Superiority: Development of Shipborne Fighters 1943–1962. North Branch, MN: Specialty Press, 2007. .
 Wagner, Ray. American Combat Planes. New York: Doubleday, Third edition, 1982. .
 Wilson, Stewart. Combat Aircraft since 1945. Fyshwick, Australia: Aerospace Publications, 2000. .

External links

 
 RCN Banshee 126402 at Shearwater Aviation Museum

McDonnell F2H Banshee
McDonnell F2H Banshee
McDonnell aircraft
Cruciform tail aircraft
Twinjets
Low-wing aircraft
Aircraft first flown in 1947